Loryma discimaculla is a species of snout moth in the genus Loryma. It was described by George Hampson in 1917 and is known from Malawi (including Mount Mulanje, the type location).

References

Moths described in 1917
Pyralini
Moths of Africa